Andalusian Convergence (in Spanish: Convergencia Andaluza; CAnda) was an Andalusian nationalist political party in Andalusia.

History
CAnda emerged in May 2006 as a split of the  Andalusian Party. It also had among its ranks with politicians like Juan Carlos Benavides, former mayor of Almuñécar (Granada), and Luis Manuel Rubiales, former mayor of Motril, from the PSOE-A.

In the municipal elections of 2007, they obtained 6,994 votes and 10 councilors (all in Almuñécar). In the 2011 elections in the same town, councilors fell to 7 of 21, although CAnda still was the most voted political party. CAnda also gained 1879 votes in Motril (2 councilors) and 698 votes in Albuñol (2 councilors).

In 2013 CAnda rejoined the Andalusian Party.

References

2006 establishments in Andalusia
2013 disestablishments in Andalusia
Andalusian nationalist parties
Defunct nationalist parties in Spain
Defunct social democratic parties in Spain
Left-wing nationalist parties
Political parties disestablished in 2013
Political parties established in 2006
Political parties in Andalusia